Neil Denis (born July 13, 1985) is a Canadian actor best known for his role as Rya'c, son of Teal'c, a Jaffa in Stargate SG-1. His first appearance was in University Hospital in 1995 at the age of 8. He also appeared in the Canadian television series 2030 CE. He has provided the voice for Spyke in X-Men: Evolution. He is known for his portrayal of Jose Merel in A Girl Like Me: The Gwen Araujo Story.

Filmography
University Hospital Danny (1 episode, 1995)
The X-Files The Catcher (1 episode, 1996)
The Sentinel Carjacker Kid #1 (1 episode, 1997)
A Call to Remember (1997) (TV) George Hicks
Zenon: Girl of the 21st Century (1999) (TV) Leo
Stargate SG-1 Rya'c (6 episodes, 1997–2004)
Big and Hairy (1998) (TV) Kid
Max Q (1998) (TV) Michael Daniels
The Inspectors (1998) (TV) Will
Golf Punks (1998) Thork
Dead Man's Gun Arthur John (1 episode, 1998)
Goosebumps Todd Erikson (3 episodes, 1998)
RoboCop: Alpha Commando (1998) Additional Voices (unknown episodes)
Freedom (1 episode, 2000)
Frankie & Hazel (2000) (TV) Abdul, Pup
First Wave (2000) Skater (1 episode, 2000)
Out of Time (2000) (TV) Sean
Seven Days Morgan (1 episode, 2000)
Spooky House (2000) 2nd Audience Child
Living with the Dead (2002) (TV) Dennis Branston
Tribe of Joseph (2002) Phillipe
X-Men: Evolution Evan Daniels/Spyke (52 episodes, 2000–2003) and Paul Haits (6 episodes, 2000–2001, 2003)
2030 CE Robby Drake (7 episodes, 2002–2003)
The Life (2004) (TV) Student #2
Zolar (2004) (TV) Hanson
Romeo! Stash (1 episode, 2004)
Fetching Cody (2005) Sudden
Alice, I Think Abelard (2 episodes, 2006)
The Dead Zone Teenage Clerk (1 episode, 2006)
A Girl Like Me: The Gwen Araujo Story (2006) (TV) Jose Merel
Beyond Loch Ness (2008) (TV) Chad
Wolverine and The X-Men Spyke and Cable/Evan Daniels (26 episodes, 2009)

External links

1985 births
Canadian male child actors
Canadian male film actors
Canadian male television actors
Canadian male voice actors
Living people
Male actors from Vancouver
Black Canadian male actors